Bradford P. Campbell was the Assistant Secretary for Employee Benefits Security of the United States Department of Labor (DOL), the official in charge of the Employee Benefits Security Administration (EBSA).  Mr. Campbell was nominated by President George W. Bush as Assistant Secretary on May 3, 2007, and was unanimously confirmed by the United States Senate on August 3, 2007.  He held the position until January 20, 2009.  Prior to his confirmation as Assistant Secretary, Mr. Campbell had served as Acting Assistant Secretary since October 30, 2006 and as EBSA's Deputy Assistant Secretary for Policy since March 5, 2004.

As the Assistant Secretary of Labor for Employee Benefits, Campbell oversaw more than 700,000 covered retirement plans, approximately 2.5 million covered health plans, and similar numbers of other welfare benefit plans, such as those providing life or disability insurance, offered by private employers in the United States. The employee benefit plans under EBSA’s jurisdiction at the time held about $6.1 trillion in assets and covered approximately 150 million Americans. As Assistant Secretary, Campbell was the primary Federal regulatory and enforcement official for Title I of the Employee Retirement Income Security Act of 1974 (ERISA).  Mr. Campbell reflected on his service in a Spring 2009 interview with InBrief, a publication of Center for Tax Law and Employee Benefits at the John Marshall Law School.

Following his service as Assistant Secretary, Mr. Campbell joined the national law firm Schiff Hardin LLP on September 16, 2009.  As a nationally recognized figure on employer-sponsored retirement, health and other welfare benefit plans, he provides his clients with insight and knowledge across a broad range of ERISA-plan related issues.  Mr. Campbell concentrates his practice in employee benefits, executive compensation and ERISA litigation, specializing in ERISA Title I issues, including fiduciary conduct and prohibited transactions.

Mr. Campbell serves on the Advisory Board for the John Marshall Law School (Chicago)'s Graduate Employee Benefits Programs.  Prior to joining EBSA, Campbell was Senior Legislative Officer at the Department of Labor.  Prior to joining the Department of Labor, Campbell served as Legislative Director for then-Congressman Ernest Fletcher and as Senior Legislative Assistant to former Congressman and SEC Chairman, Christopher Cox.  Campbell received his A.B. from Harvard University, and his J.D., cum laude, from the Georgetown University Law Center.

References

External links
 Official biography
 Video of Campbell Testimony on 401(k) Plan Fees and Expenses Before a Hearing of the Senate Health, Education, Labor and Pensions Committee on September 17, 2008
 Written Testimony 9/17/2008
 Testimony News Release 9/17/2008
 Testimony on Payroll Deduction Individual Retirement Accounts (IRAs) and Employer-Sponsored IRAs before the House Committee on Ways and Means Subcommittee on Select Revenue Measures on June 26, 2008
 Testimony News Release 6/26/2008
 Testimony on 401(k) Plan Fees and Expenses before the House Committee on Ways and Means October 30, 2007
 Written testimony 10/30/2007
 Video of Testimony on 401(k) Plan Fees and Expenses before the Senate Special Committee on Aging, October 24, 2007
 Written Testimony, October 24, 2007
 Written Testimony on 401(k) Plan Fees and Expenses before the House Committee on Education and Labor, October 10, 2007

Year of birth missing (living people)
Living people
Georgetown University Law Center alumni
Harvard University alumni
United States Department of Labor officials